The Day the Rains Came may refer to:

Songs 
"The Day the Rains Came" (song), 1958 song by Jane Morgan
"The Day the Rains Came", a 1969 song by Merle Haggard from Pride in What I Am

Film
 The Day the Rains Came (film), a 1959 West German film